Celine J. Marmion is a Professor of Chemistry at the Royal College of Surgeons in Ireland and President of the Institute of Chemistry of Ireland. She is a Fellow of the Royal Society of Chemistry and the Institute of Chemistry of Ireland. Marmion is involved with the design of new chemotherapeutic drugs.

Early life and education 
Marmion earned her doctoral degree at the University of Surrey in 1994. Her PhD research involved investigations into vanadium complexes and nitrogen fixation. In 1994 Marmion was appointed as a lecturer at St Mary's University, Twickenham, where she worked until 1995. She returned to study in 1995, and earned a Postgraduate Certificate in Education (PGCE) at Kingston University.

Research and career 
In 1997 Marmion joined Royal College of Surgeons in Ireland as a lecturer in the Department of Chemistry. She was promoted to Associate Professor in 2013 and Professor in 2018. Her research considers the design of metal-based chemotherapeutic drugs. In particular, this has included the design of targeted PtIV prodrugs. Immunodeficient cancer patients are at risk of developing infections, which occasionally require antimicrobial prophylaxis. To better serve these patients Marmion developed a family of metallo-antibiotics, based on a Cu-N,N-framework, which can bind to DNA, has DNA oxidant properties and has antiproliferative and antimicrobial properties. Her research has been supported by the Science Foundation Ireland (SFI) to create a prodrug strategy for multi-modal chemotherapeutics.

Awards and honours 
Her awards and honours include:

 2009 Royal College of Surgeons in Ireland President's Teaching Award 'for excellence in teaching'
 2010 Vice-Dean of the Royal College of Surgeons in Ireland Faculty of Medicine & Health Sciences
2013 President of the Irish Biological Inorganic Chemistry Society
 2013 Elected Fellow of the Royal Society of Chemistry
 2015 Elected Fellow of the Institute of Chemistry of Ireland
 2015 Royal College of Surgeons in Ireland President's Teaching Award 'for excellence in teaching'
 2016 Royal College of Surgeons in Ireland Dean's Academic Award for 'Endeavour, Innovation, Collaboration and Service' 
 2017 Irish Network of Healthcare Educators Education Research Grant
 2017 Vice President of the Institute of Chemistry of Ireland
 2019 President of the Institute of Chemistry of Ireland

Selected publications 
Her publications include:

References 

Living people
Year of birth missing (living people)
Fellows of the Royal Society of Chemistry
Alumni of the University of Surrey
Royal College of Surgeons in Ireland
Cancer researchers